Ottaviano "Ottavio" Andriani (Francavilla Fontana, 4 January 1974) is a former Italian marathon runner.

He won bronze medal with the national team at the 2010 European Marathon Cup.

Biography
Ottaviano Andriani participated at one edition of the Summer Olympics (2008) and World Championships (2005) and four of the European Championships (1998, 2002, 2006, 2010), he has 9 caps in national team from 1998 to 2008.

Achievements

See also
 Italian all-time lists - Marathon

References

External links
 

1974 births
Living people
People from Francavilla Fontana
Italian male marathon runners
Athletes (track and field) at the 2008 Summer Olympics
Olympic athletes of Italy
Athletics competitors of Fiamme Oro
Sportspeople from the Province of Brindisi